Narciso Agúndez Montaño (born 26 October 1958) is a Mexican former politician who served as governor of Baja California Sur from 2005 to 2011. Elected on February 6, 2005, he took office on April 5, 2005, and is the second member of Party of the Democratic Revolution to hold the office of governor in Baja California Sur, after his predecessor and cousin Leonel Cota Montaño.

A graduate of the Autonomous University of Baja California Sur, he began his political career in 1984 as Director of the Promotion of Agriculture in Los Cabos, and in 1986 became the Director of Municipal Services there. He was detained by the Mexican authorities on 24 May 2012 for embezzlement, and is currently under custody.

References

External links
Trayectoria Política (Political Career). Government of the State of Baja California Sur.  Retrieved on August 25, 2006.

1958 births
Living people
Governors of Baja California Sur
People from Los Cabos Municipality
21st-century Mexican politicians
Party of the Democratic Revolution politicians
Autonomous University of Baja California Sur alumni
Municipal presidents in Baja California Sur